You Must Get Married is a 1936 British comedy film directed by Leslie Pearce and starring Frances Day, Neil Hamilton and Robertson Hare. It was based on a novel of the same title by David Evans.

Premise
In order to be able to work in Britain an American actress marries a British sailor.

Cast
 Frances Day as Fenella Dane
 Neil Hamilton as Michael Brown
 Robertson Hare as Percy Phut
 Wally Patch as Chief Blow
 Gus McNaughton as Bosun
 Fred Duprez as Cyrus P. Hankin
 Dennis Wyndham as Albert Gull
 C. Denier Warren as Mr Wurtsell
 James Carew as Mr Schillinger

References

External links

1936 films
1936 comedy films
British comedy films
British black-and-white films
Films directed by Leslie Pearce
1930s English-language films
1930s British films